Gujarati is a Unicode block containing characters for writing the Gujarati language. In its original incarnation, the code points U+0A81..U+0AD0 were a direct copy of the Gujarati characters A1-F0 from the 1988 ISCII standard. The Devanagari, Bengali, Gurmukhi, Oriya, Tamil, Telugu, Kannada, and Malayalam blocks were similarly all based on their ISCII encodings.

Block

History
The following Unicode-related documents record the purpose and process of defining specific characters in the Gujarati block:

References

External links 
 https://en.wikibooks.org/wiki/How_to_use_Unicode_in_creating_Gujarati_script

Unicode blocks